Azamat Sydykov (born 1986 in Bishkek (Frunze), Soviet Union) is a Kyrgyz concert pianist who has played solo concerts internationally through Kyrgyzstan, Russia, Switzerland, Germany, Iran, Turkey, Ukraine, Finland, Italy and Netherlands. Having settled in New York City, Sydkov has there performed at Steinway Hall, Mannes Concert Hall, Gilder Lehrman Hall, Greenwich House, David Greer Recital Hall and United Nations Headquarters in New York.

References 

http://www.bbc.com/kyrgyz/entertainment/2014/03/140318_azamat_sydykov_kyrgyz_musician, by N. Konurbaeva, British Broadcasting Corporation, Kyrgyz Service, March 18, 2014
http://www.bbc.com/kyrgyz/kyrgyzstan/2014/01/140122_iv_sydykov, by N. Konurbaeva, British Broadcasting Corporation, Kyrgyz Service, January 22, 2014
http://www.sierrasun.com/entertainment/17022110-113/nevada-opera-to-present-piano-concert-at-north, Sierra Sun newspaper, 
http://cvnc.org/article.cfm?articleId=6996, Azamat Sydykov Plays "Movie Tunes" to Open this Year's Clayton Piano Festival, by Andrea McKerlie Luke, CVNC: An online Art Journal in North Carolina, October 4, 2014
https://web.archive.org/web/20160805014008/http://www.carnegiehall.org/Calendar/2014/5/16/0800/PM/Azamat-Sydykov-Piano/, The official website of The Carnegie Hall
https://web.archive.org/web/20160805025557/http://www.carnegiehall.org/m/event.aspx?view=full&id=4295013057, The official website of The Carnegie Hall
https://www.youtube.com/watch?v=qNrrRW9vzwE, Meet Azamat -Azamat Sydykov: The Carnegie Hall Debut, a promo video on artists YouTube channel
https://www.youtube.com/watch?v=EZyeurhZ7aA&spfreload=10, Американская Мечта: Азамат Сыдыков, a documentary film by Nikolay Yarst and Philip Vasilenko
http://www.eng.24.kg/culture/173544-news24.html,Kyrgyz pianist Azamat Sydykov to perform at Carnegie Hall (USA), by Kanykei Manasova,  24.kg news agency, April 12, 2014
https://www.sfcv.org/event/nevada-opera/joint-piano-recital-jonathan-levin-and-azamat-sydykov,Joint piano recital - Jonathan Levin and Azamat sydykov, San Francisco Classical Voice
 http://www.akipress.org/people/news:364/, People of Kyrgyzstan: Azamat Sydykov, by V. Jamankulova, AKIPRESS news agency 
 http://www.news-asia.ru/view/1630, Азамат Сыдыков: "Важно извлечь уроки и двигаться дальше" by Yulia Konovalova, NEWS-ASIA.RU
 http://rus.azattyk.org/content/kyrgyzstan_sydykov/24575978.html, Азамат Сыдыков: У нас все получится!, by Amirbek Azam Uulu, Radio "Azattyk", May 10, 2012
 http://www.azattyk.kg/content/pianist_azamat_sydykov_usa_music_culture_kyrgyzstan/24549114.html, " Азамат Сыдыков: Катасыз ийгиликке жетпейсин!...by Amirbek Azam Uulu, Radio "Azattyk", April 23, 2012
 http://www.vb.kg/doc/195760_azamat_sydykov:_hochy_chtoby_v_kyrgyzstane_lubili_klassicheskyu_myzyky.html, Азамат Сыдыков: Хочу, чтобы в Кыргызстане любили классическую музыку, by Anna Yalovkina, Vecherny Bishkek newspaper

External links

Kyrgyzstani classical musicians
Living people
1986 births
People from Bishkek